The enzyme 3-cyanoalanine hydratase catalyzes the chemical reaction

L-asparagine  3-cyanoalanine + H2O

This enzyme belongs to the family of lyases, specifically the hydro-lyases, which cleave carbon-oxygen bonds.  The systematic name of this enzyme class is L-asparagine hydro-lyase (3-cyanoalanine-forming). Other names in common use include β-cyanoalanine hydrolase, β-cyanoalanine hydratase, β-CNAla hydrolase, β-CNA nitrilase, and L-asparagine hydro-lyase.  This enzyme participates in cyanoamino acid metabolism.

References 

 

EC 4.2.1
Enzymes of unknown structure